Jérémy Lecarour (born August 15, 1983 in Auray, Brittany), better known by his stage name Norman Doray, is a French musician, DJ and music producer.

Discography

Charting singles

Singles
 2006: "Let U Go" (as The Freshmakers) (Serial Records)
 2006: "In The Name of Love"
 2006: "Dance All Night EP" (with Pierre de la Touche) (Disco Galaxy)
 2007: "Jetlag" (Serial Records)
 2007: "Apocalypse" (with Arno Cost) (CR2 Records)
 2008: "Miracle" (as The Frenchmakers) (Serial Records)
 2008: "Krystal" (CR2 Records)
 2009: "Last Forever" (with Tristan Garner and Errol Reid) (CR2 Records)
 2009: "Drink N Dial" (with Albin Myers) (Joia Records/Serial Records)
 2009: "Tobita" (CR2 Records)
 2010: "Chase the Sun" (with David Tort) (Nero Records)
 2010: "Tweet it" (with Tim Berg and Sebastien Drums) (Size Records)
 2010: "Paradisco" (Arno Cost, Norman Doray and Ben Macklin)
 2011: "Champagne" (with Richard Grey)
 2011: "Kalifornia" (Strictly Rhythm)
 2011: "Breakaway" featuring Tawiah (Warner Music)
 2012: "Trilogy" (with Laidback Luke and Arno Cost) (Mixmash Records)
 2012: "Leo" (Spinnin Records)
 2012: "Cracks" featuring Andreas Moe (Spinnin Records)
 2012: "Music" (with Mitomi Tokoto) (Azuli Records)
 2012: "Celsius" (with Eddie Thoneick) (Size Records)
 2012: "Something To Believe In" (with Nervo and Cookie) (Spinnin Records)
 2013: "Filtre" (LE7ELS)
 2013: "TroubleMaker" (Size Records)
 2014: "Darkest Days (Apocalypse 2014)" (with Arno Cost and Dev) (Spinnin' Records)
 2014: "Strong" (with Arno Cost) (Size Records)
 2015: "Rising Love" (with Arno Cost and Mike Taylor) (Polydor)
 2015: "Bring Back The Groove" (with Bottai) (Armada)
 2015: "Street Sounds"(Spinnin' Records)
 2016: "Falling For You"  (Spinnin' Records)
 2016: "All In" (Armada Music)
 2016: "For Real" (Spinnin' Records)
 2017: "Somethin' About" (Flamingo Records)
 2018: "Enough"
 2019: "Together" (With Arno Cost) (Positiva Records)
 2019: "Travolta" (with Arno Cost) [Stmpd Rcrds]
 2019: "Do What" (Hotfingers Records)
 2019: "Wanna Do" (with Arno Cost) (Club Sweat)
 2020: "Take Some Time" (with Santeli and Bigstate) (Spinnin' Deep)
 2020: "Darlin'" (with Arno Cost) (A Positiva / Virgin EMI Records)
 2020: "Tell The World" (featuring Sneaky Sound System) (CR2 Records)
 2020: "One Night" (with Arno Cost) [Stmpd Rcrds]
 2020: "Give It Up" (with Piem) (Spinnin' Deep)
 2020: "Dat's Right" (Sushi Muzik)
 2021: "Show Luv" (with Arno Cost) (Spinnin' Records)

Remixes
2006:
 Da Sushiman – In & Out (The Freshmakers Remix) - Ledge Music
 Rilod – Thriller (The Freshmakers Remix) – Nice Music
 Mathieu Bouthier and Muttonheads aka Serial Crew – Make Your Own Kind of Music (The Frenchmakers Remix) - Serial Records

2007:
 Henrik B – Soul Heaven (Norman Doray Remix) - Nero Records
 Sunfreakz – Counting Down the Days (Norman Doray and Arno Cost aka Le Monde Remix) - Pool E Music
 Antoine Clamaran featuring Lulu Hughes – Give Some Love (Arno Cost and Norman Doray aka Le Monde Remix) - Pool E Music

2008:
 David Guetta Feat. Tara McDonald – Delirious (Norman Doray and Arno Cost Remix) - EMI
 Tom De Neef and Laidback Luke – Humanoidz (Norman Doray and Arno Cost Remix) - MixMash Records
 Seamus Haji vs Lords of Flatbush – 24 Hours (Nice Tight Derriere) (Norman Doray Remix) - Big Love
 The Cube Guys – Baba O'Riley (Norman Doray and Arno Cost Remix) - Ministry of Sound Uk
 Zoo Brazil – Kalle (Norman Doray and Arno Cost Remix) - Nero Records

2009:
 Those Usual Suspects – Shadows (Norman Doray Remix) - Ministry of Sound Australia
 David Guetta featuring Kelly Rowland – When Love Takes Over (Norman Doray and Arno Cost Remix) - EMI
 The Face vs Mark Brown and Adam Shaw – Needin U (Norman Doray Eivissa Remix) - CR2 Records
 Eric Prydz and Steve Angello – Woz not Noz (Norman Doray and Arno Cost Tribute Remix) - CR2 Records

2010:
 Toni Braxton – Make My Heart (Norman Doray Remix) - Atlantic Records
 Henrik B Feat. Christian Alvestam – Now and Forever (Norman Doray Cazzo Remix) - Nero Records
 Dirty South featuring Rudy – Phazing (Norman Doray Remix) - Phazing Records

2011:
 Sandy Rivera and Rae – Hide U (Norman Doray Remix) - Defected Records
 David Tort featuring Gosha – One Look (Norman Doray Remix) - Axtone Records
 David Guetta featuring Taio Cruz – Little Bad Girl (Norman Doray Remix) - EMI

2012:
 Kaskade and Skrillex – Lick It (Norman Doray Remix) - Ultra
 Sneaky Sound System – Friends (Norman Doray Remix) - Modular

2013:
 Robin Thicke featuring Kendrick Lamar – Give It 2 U (Norman Doray and Rob Adans Remix) - Star Trak

2014:
 Andrew Bayer – England (Norman Doray Edit) (Norman Doray Edit) - Anjunadeep
 Disclosure featuring Sam Smith – Latch (Norman Doray Remix) - PMR
 La Roux – Uptight Downtown (Norman Doray Remix) - Polydor

2015:
 Cerrone – Love in C Minor (Norman Doray LA Remix) - Malligator
 Demi Lovato – Cool for the Summer (Norman Doray Remix) - Island Records
 Ryn Weaver – Promises (Norman Doray Remix) - Interscope
 Mike Taylor – Body High (Norman Doray Venice Remix) - Free

2016:
 Chromeo – Night by Night (Norman Doray French Remix) - Free

2019:
 Arno Cost - Set Me Free (Norman Doray Recut) - Size Records
 S.A.M - Fury's Laughter (Norman Doray Remix) - Spinnin' Deep

2020:
 Phil Fuldner - Fever Clip (Arno Cost and Norman Doray Remix)

2021
 Arty - One Night Away (Arno Cost and Norman Doray Remix)

2022
 Young Parisians and Katherine Amy - Rediscover (Norman Doray Remix)

References

Notes
 A  Did not enter the Ultratop 50, but peaked on the Dance chart.
 B  Did not enter the Ultratop 50, but peaked on the Dance Bubbling Under chart.

Sources

External links
 

French DJs
French house musicians
Living people
1983 births
Electronic dance music DJs